A Josephson voltage standard is a complex system that uses a superconducting integrated circuit chip operating at a temperature of 4 K to generate stable voltages that depend only on an applied frequency and fundamental constants. It is an intrinsic standard in the sense that it does not depend on any physical artifact. It is the most accurate method to generate or measure voltage and, by international agreement in 1990, is the basis for voltage standards around the world.

Josephson effect
In 1962, Brian Josephson, a graduate student at Cambridge University, derived equations for the current and voltage across a junction consisting of a thin insulating barrier separating two superconductors – now generally known as a Josephson junction. This prediction was verified experimentally by Shapiro in 1963 and has become known as the (inverse) AC Josephson effect. This effect found immediate application in metrology because it relates the volt to the second through a proportionality involving only fundamental constants. Initially, this led to an improved value of the ratio . Today it is the basis for all primary voltage standards. Josephson's equation for the supercurrent through a superconductive tunnel junction is given by

where  is the junction current,  is the critical current,  is the junction voltage.   is a function of the junction geometry, the temperature, and any residual magnetic field inside the magnetic shields that are used with voltage standard devices. When a dc voltage is applied across the junction, Eq. (1) shows that the current will oscillate at a frequency , where  is approximately equal to 484 GHz/mV. The very high frequency and low level of this oscillation make it difficult to observe directly. However, if an AC current at frequency  is applied to the junction, the junction oscillation  tends to phase lock to the applied frequency. Under this phase lock, the average voltage across the junction equals . This results in a series of steps at voltages , where  is an integer, as shown in Fig. 1a.

The Josephson effect was initially used to improve the measurement of the constant  based on voltage values derived from the SI volt realization as maintained by Weston cells. The uncertainty of these measurements was limited by the uncertainty of the SI volt realization and the stability of the Weston cells. Thus, in the early 1970s, many national standards laboratories adopted a value for the Josephson constant  and began using the (inverse) AC Josephson effect as the practical standard of voltage. This inconsistency was corrected in 1990 when, by international agreement, the constant  was assigned the value 483597.9 GHz/V and adopted by all standards laboratories. The assigned value is based on a weighted average of volt realization measurements made prior to 1990 at many national measurement institutions. Standards such as the Josephson volt that depend on fundamental constants rather than physical artifacts are known as intrinsic standards. Although the Josephson voltage standard (JVS) does not realize the SI definition of the volt, it provides a very stable reference voltage that can be reproduced anywhere without the need to transfer artifacts such as Weston cells. The accuracy of the Josephson voltage–frequency relation , and its independence from experimental conditions, such as bias current, temperature, and junction materials, have been subjected to many tests. No significant deviation from this relation has ever been found. In the most precise of these experiments, two Josephson devices are driven by the same frequency source, biased on the same step, and connected in a series opposition loop across a small  inductor. Since this loop is entirely superconductive, any voltage difference leads to a changing magnetic field in the inductor. This field is detected with a SQUID magnetometer and its constancy has set an upper limit on the voltage difference of less than 3 parts in 1019. Figure 2 is a semilog plot that illustrates how typical differences in dc voltage measurements among National Measurement Institutes (NMIs) have decreased over the last 70 years. The two major improvements coincide with the introduction of single-junction Josephson standards in the early 1970s and the introduction of series-array Josephson standards beginning in 1984.

Early Josephson standards 

Although the AC Josephson effect provides a much more stable voltage reference than Weston cells, the first single-junction Josephson standards
were difficult to use because they generated very small voltages (1–10 mV).  Several attempts were made to raise the voltage by connecting two or more junctions in series.  The most ambitious of these
used 20 junctions in series to realize a voltage of 100 mV with an uncertainty of a few parts in 109.  Ensuring that every junction was on a constant voltage step required individually adjusting the bias current to each of the 20 junctions.  The difficulty of this procedure makes arrays of significantly more than 20 junctions impractical.
 

         
In 1977, Levinson et al.
made a suggestion that would ultimately lead to a solution to the multiple-bias problem.  Levinson pointed out the importance of the parameter  in determining the characteristics of RF-induced Josephson steps.  is a measure of the damping of Josephson oscillations by the junction shunting resistance .   In particular, he showed that junctions with a large capacitance  and a large  could generate an I–V curve with hysteretic constant-voltage steps like those shown in Fig. 1b.  These steps have become known as zero-crossing steps because they cross the zero-current axis of the I–V curve. The lack of stable regions between the first few steps means that for small DC bias currents, the junction voltage must be quantized.  With a common bias current at or near zero, the voltage across a large array of these junctions must also be quantized.  The possibility of obtaining constant-voltage steps at zero current over a wide range of junction and operating parameters suggested the possibility of building a voltage standard using large arrays of junctions.

After several preliminary experiments,
a joint effort in 1984 between the National Bureau of Standards in the U. S. and the Physikalisch-Technische Bundes-Anstalt in Germany resolved the problems of junction stability and microwave distribution and created the first large Josephson array based on Levinson's idea.  Further design improvements and system development produced the first practical 1 V Josephson standards in 1985.
Advances in superconductive integrated circuit technology, largely driven by the quest for a Josephson junction computer,
soon made possible much larger arrays.
Numerous further refinements were made as 10 V Josephson standards were implemented in many national standards laboratories.
By 1989, all of the hardware and software for a complete voltage metrology system was commercially available.  Today, there are Josephson array voltage standards in more than 70 national, industrial, and military standards laboratories around the world.  A program of international comparisons carried out by the Bureau International des Poids et Mesures (BIPM) has measured differences between a traveling Josephson standard and those of NMIs that are typically less than 1 part in 109.

Junction design details 

Figure 3 illustrates the basic structure of one junction in a large series array.  The junction is an overlap between two superconductive thin films that are separated by a thin oxide barrier.  The junction sits above a ground plane and is separated from it by a few micrometers of insulation.  A dc current  and a microwave current  are driven through the junction.  The design parameters for the junction are its length , width , critical current density  (critical current per unit area), and the microwave drive frequency . The practical realization of an array voltage standard requires a thorough understanding of how these parameters affect the stability of the quantized voltage levels shown in Fig. 1b.  Stable operation requires that four conditions be satisfied:
  must be small enough that the flux induced through the junction area by the microwave magnetic field is much less than the flux quantum 
 Both  and  must be small enough that the lowest resonant cavity mode of the junction is greater than 
 The junction's critical current  should be as large as possible to prevent noise-induced quantum step transitions.
If any of these conditions is violated, the junction voltage is likely to switch randomly among several steps, making measurements impossible. A rigorous derivation of these conditions is the subject of several papers by Kautz.

While stable arrays have been demonstrated at frequencies as low as 24 GHz,
most practical standards operate in the range 70–96 GHz.  Table 1 lists a typical set of junction parameters for a commonly used design.

Array design 

At lower microwave current the steps cover a smaller range of voltage and at higher microwave current the steps become smaller and begin to move off the zero current axis. In a large array, every junction must generate a large zero crossing step and thus the microwave power must be adjusted to a value low enough to accommodate the one junction receiving the largest microwave drive. Thus, in order to obtain the largest voltage from the smallest number of junctions, an array  standard requires a circuit design that can deliver nearly uniform microwave power to many thousands of junctions, all of which are connected in series. The solution to this problem is a simple extension of Fig. 3 to a series of junctions in a line over a ground plane as shown in Fig. 5a. This results in a microwave stripline that can propagate microwave power with relatively low loss.
The capacitive impedance of the junctions is so small (approximately 1 mΩ ) relative to the strip line impedance (approx. 3 Ω) that each junction has a very minor effect on the propagation of microwave power in the strip line.  Typically, each junction will absorb about 0.02% to 0.04%  of the power propagating through it.  It is thus possible to connect several thousand junctions in series and still achieve a power uniformity of about  ±1.5 dB. With careful design, striplines with as many as 4800 junctions have been used.

Because  Josephson standards require about  junctions, it is necessary to adopt a series/parallel circuit similar to that shown in Fig. 5b.[39]  Here, a network of low- and high-pass filters allow the microwave power to be split into four parallel paths while maintaining a dc path in which all junctions are connected in series.
          

A typical integrated circuit layout for an array of  junctions is shown in Fig. 6.  The microwave drive power is collected from a waveguide by a finline antenna, split 16 ways, and injected into 16 junction strip lines of 1263 junctions each.  The junction striplines are separated from a superconductive ground plane by about 2 micrometers of SiO2 dielectric. Symmetry in the splitting network ensures that the same power is delivered to each subarray. Several precautions are required to avoid reflections that would lead to standing waves and the consequent  nonuniform power distribution within the subarrays:  (1) Each stripline is terminated by a matched load that consists of several wavelengths of resistive strip line.  The use of resistive stripline rather than a discrete resistor guarantees a near-perfect match over a wide range of fabrication parameters. (2) The dimensions of capacitors in the low- and high-pass filters are chosen to avoid resonances near the drive frequency.  (3)  The microwave bend radius has a minimum value of three times the stripline width.  Sharper bends result in unacceptable reflections.  In order to meet the bend requirement while still packing the array strips close together, "curly" bends that turn 215° and then back 45° are used.  (4) The junction spacing along the line must be close enough to avoid a resonance between adjacent junctions. Microwave power is applied by inserting the finline end of the chip into a slot parallel to the E-field in a WR-12 waveguide.    The dc output appears across superconducting pads at the edge of the chip.

Fabrication 

Voltage standard chips are typically fabricated on silicon or glass substrates.  The integrated circuit has eight levels: (1) a 300 nm thick Nb ground plane, (2) a 2 μm layer of SiO that forms the microstripline dielectric, (3) a 200 nm Nb film that forms the lower electrode of the Josephson junctions, (4) a 3 nm metal oxide layer that forms the Josephson tunneling barrier, (5) a 100 nm Nb junction counter electrode (6) a 300 nm SiO2 film with windows for contacts to the counter electrode, (7) a 400 nm film of Nb that connects the junction counter electrodes, and (8) a 100 nm resistive film that forms the stripline terminations.

Measurement systems 
 
A block diagram of a modern Josephson voltage standard system is shown in Fig. 7.  The Josephson array chip is mounted inside a high-permeability magnetic shield at the end of a cryoprobe that makes the transition between a liquid helium Dewar and the room temperature environment. Some systems use a cryocooler to cool the chip and eliminate the need for liquid helium.  Three pairs of copper wires are connected to the array.  One pair supplies bias current, a second monitors the array voltage with an oscilloscope, and the third pair delivers the array voltage to the calibration system.  All of the wires pass through multiple levels of RFI filtering in a box at the top of the Dewar.  The box, the filters, and the Dewar itself form a shield that protects the Josephson array from electromagnetic interference that could cause step transitions.  Microwave power is delivered through a waveguide consisting of a 12 mm diameter tube with WR-12 launching horns on each end. Tubes of solid German silver or stainless steel plated internally with silver or gold are commonly used.  This waveguide simultaneously achieves low thermal loss (<0.5 L liquid He per day) and low microwave loss (as low as 0.7 dB at 75 GHz).

         
A phase-locked oscillator (PLO) operating at a frequency near 75 GHz provides the microwave power to the chip. The primary requirements for the 75 GHz source are: (1) its frequency must be known with high accuracy (1 part in 1010) and (2) it should produce a stable output power of at least 50 mW. It is useful, although not essential, to be able to tune the source over a range of frequencies.  The PLO may be constructed using a commercial microwave counter with feedback capability or it may be a custom built phase-locked loop.  More recently microwave frequency synthesizers that are more reliable and offer a wider tuning range and resolution have become the preferred microwave source.  The frequency reference for the system is usually a 10 MHz sine wave derived from a GPS receiver or an atomic clock.

The zero crossing steps of Fig. 1b allow a single bias current passing through the entire junction array while insuring that every junction in the array is on a constant voltage step.  This leads to significant complication in setting the array to a particular desired step.  Figure 8a illustrates a simplified diagram of the bias circuit.  In this circuit a computer sets the bias voltage  with one digital-to-analog converter (DAC) and uses a second DAC to control the bias impedance  via optically modulated resistors.  Figure 8b shows a graphical solution for the stable operating points of the array and illustrates how control of both the bias voltage and the bias impedance is used to select a particular quantum voltage step.
The load line plots the range of voltage and current that are defined by the bias supply. The intersections of this load line with the I–V curve of the array (vertical lines) are possible stable bias points. Changes to  shift the load line left and right, whereas changes to  change its slope. This makes the load line steep enough to intersect only one or two steps and forces the array to a step at or very near . After a step is selected, the source impedance is smoothly increased on all four bias connections (load line becomes horizontal) until the array current goes to zero and the array is effectively disconnected from the bias source. This open-bias condition is the most stable state for the array and eliminates the possibility of any errors resulting from a small series resistance in the array – a common array defect. Computer control of this three-step process enables the system to find and stabilize the array voltage on a particular step within a few seconds. High quality Josephson arrays will remain on a selected step for many hours.

Numerous algorithms have been developed to compare a Josephson standard with a secondary standard or another Josephson standard.  These algorithms differ in the amount of averaging used, the type and placement of reversing switches, and the statistical methods used to reduce the data and compute uncertainty.  The selection of an algorithm depends on the type of comparison, the desired level of uncertainty, and the time available.  One commonly used algorithm that is appropriate for calibrations of Zener reference standards is described here.

Example measurement algorithm 

The voltage of an unknown reference  relative to the Josephson array voltage is determined using the circuit shown in Fig. 9 (a subset of Fig. 7) in which the unknown and the Josephson array are connected in series opposition across a null meter.  A reversing switch is used to eliminate the effect of thermal and other offset voltages.  The step number  and sometimes the frequency  are adjusted to make the null voltage as small as possible.  The circuit equation can then be written:

Here,  is the Josephson array voltage, V0 is a combination of  thermal offset voltages and any offset voltage in the nullmeter, mt represents a linear drift component of the offset voltage,  is the polarity of the reversing switch,  is the differential null voltage, and  represents noise in the unknown, the null meter, and any other sources of random noise.

This eliminates data that may be corrupted by the transient that occurs when there is a spontaneous transition between quantum voltage steps. Since  and  change by equal amounts during a step transition,  remains constant thus making the data collection process relatively immune to step transitions. Data are collected efficiently even for a Josephson array chip that may be making as many as five transitions per minute. The scatter in the data that results from noise in the unknown and in the null meter can generally be modeled by a Gaussian process with one standard deviation on the order of 20 to 100 nV. There are, however, occasional noise spikes that do not fit this process and generate glitches in the  data that may lie 1 μV  to 10 μV away from the well behaved data. An outlier test is used to detect and eliminate such data.

After the collection of the first data set, the polarity of the unknown is reversed, the bias is readjusted to select a step that minimizes , and a second set of data is acquired. Two more reversals generate third and fourth data sets. Typically, this entire calibration algorithm is controlled by a computer and is completed in a few minutes.
   
Systems like that shown in Fig. 7 are used to calibrate secondary standards, such as Weston cells, Zener references, and precise digital voltmeters. The typical uncertainty in measurements of 10 V Zener standards is limited by noise in the Zener to about 0.01 ppm. The ability to set the Josephson array to a wide range of discrete voltages also makes it the most accurate tool for measuring the linearity of high-accuracy digital voltmeters.

Uncertainty 

In the case of a known error, such as a reference frequency offset or a known leakage resistance, a correction can be made. It is then the metrologist's task to assign realistic numbers to all uncertainties including the uncertainty in the corrections. One method of doing this notes that only items 1 and 2 in Table 2 depend on the voltage across the Josephson array. All of the other components are about the same regardless of the array voltage. Therefore, the combined effect of items 3–8 can be quantitatively evaluated by making a set of measurements of a short circuit using exactly the same algorithm that is used for any other measurement. The standard error resulting from items 3–8 is just the root mean square (RMS) value of the set of short circuit measurements.
Additional experiments must be performed to estimate frequency and leakage uncertainty.  Internationally accepted procedures for combining uncertainty and establishing confidence intervals is the subject of the BIPM's Guide to the Evaluation of Uncertainty in Measurement.
Typically, the total uncertainty contribution of a Josephson system in a measurement averaging time of a few minutes is a few nanovolts.  Since the most common use of these systems is the calibration of Zener standards with a noise level of 50–100 nV, the contribution of the Josephson system is negligible.
         

Table 2.  Potential sources of error and uncertainty for a Josephson standard

Traceability and equivalence 

A Congressional act in 1904 established the U.S. Legal Volt to be a quantity defined by the National Bureau of Standards, now the National Institute of Standards and Technology (NIST).  With the 1990 international agreement on the Josephson representation of the volt, NIST defined the U.S. Legal Volt to be the same as the international volt representation.  Since the success of the first Josephson array voltage standards in 1984, their use has proliferated to more than 70 national measurement institutes (NMIs), military, and commercial laboratories around the world.    This has resulted in some confusion about the traceability of non-NMIs that are in possession of a JVS that is, in principle, as good as the national standard.  Some guidance on this question is provided in International Standards Organization (ISO) documents that state the general principle that intrinsic standards like the JVS, that have participated in a comparison with an NMI, can claim traceability.

References

Josephson effect
Metrology
Electronics standards